Leonora Mackinnon (born May 30, 1994) is a female épée fencer from The United Kingdom, now competing for Canada. MacKinnon won the bronze medal at the 2015 Pan American Championships in Santiago, and later competed at the 2015 Pan American Games, in Toronto, Ontario. Mackinnon originally competed for her native United Kingdom, but later made the switch to competing for Canada, as her mother was born in Toronto, which makes her a Canadian citizen as well.

Mackinnon qualified to represent her country at the 2016 Summer Olympics, by being ranked in the top two in the Americas.

References

External links
 

Living people
1994 births
Canadian female fencers
Fencers at the 2015 Pan American Games
British female fencers
Sportspeople from Basingstoke
Olympic fencers of Canada
Fencers at the 2016 Summer Olympics
Fencers at the 2019 Pan American Games
Pan American Games competitors for Canada